Brandon Anthony Austin (born 8 January 1999) is an English professional footballer who plays as a goalkeeper for Premier League club Tottenham Hotspur.

Club career

Tottenham Hotspur
After being released from Chelsea as a schoolboy, Austin joined Tottenham Hotspur in 2015. In his first year with the club he was limited to five appearances with the under-18 team. The following year he made 16 appearances, more than any other under-18 goalkeeper at the club during the 2016–17 season. In the same season he also made two appearances for the under-23 in the Premier League 2 and a further appearance in the 2016–17 UEFA Youth League.

After traveling with the Spurs first-team during the team's 2017 preseason tour of the United States, he made the permanent step up to under-23 level for the 2017–18 season. During the season he made two appearances during the 2017–18 EFL Trophy against EFL clubs Luton Town and AFC Wimbledon and was a key part of the team's run to the 2017–18 UEFA Youth League quarter-finals before being eliminated by Monaco on penalties.

During the 2019–20 season, Austin traveled with the first-team as the emergency third goalkeeper for a few weeks. He was named as a first-team substitute for the first time on 19 October 2019 for Spurs' Premier League match against Watford as a backup to Paulo Gazzaniga following an injury to Hugo Lloris and ahead of fellow academy team-mate Alfie Whiteman. He signed a new two-and-a-half-year contract with Spurs in December 2019.

In total, Austin made 78 appearances in the Tottenham youth system, recording 12 clean sheets and captaining the club's under-19 side during the 2018–19 UEFA Youth League.

Loan to Viborg FF
Austin spent the second half of the 2019–20 season on loan to Danish second-tier side Viborg FF, appearing in 14 games and recording one clean sheet.

Loan to Orlando City  
On 22 January 2021, Austin was loaned to MLS side Orlando City SC ahead of the 2021 season for six months with an option to extend the loan another six months. Having been an unused substitute in the first seven games of the season, Austin made his club debut on 19 June in a league game against Toronto FC in place of regular starter Pedro Gallese who was away on international duty at the 2021 Copa América. Orlando won the game 3–2. He kept his first clean sheet in the following match, a 5–0 win over San Jose Earthquakes. He played all five games during Gallese's absence, keeping one clean sheet and conceding eight goals. With Gallese out injured, Austin was a substitute on 30 July behind Mason Stajduhar who was making his debut more than five years after signing with the club. The following day it was announced Austin had returned to Tottenham following the conclusion of his initial six-month loan contract.

International career
Austin is eligible to represent England, the United States and the US Virgin Islands. In April 2017, he made his debut for the United States under-18 against Slovakia in the Slovakia Cup. In the same year he was named as the England under-19 standby goalkeeper for that summer's European championships. He earned his first call-up to the England under-21 team in October 2019.

Personal life
Austin was born in Hemel Hempstead and attended Cavendish School. Austin's father is former England international basketball player Neville Austin, an integral part of the 1996–97 BBL winning London Towers team.

Career statistics

References

External links

 Profile at the Tottenham Hotspur F.C. website
 

1999 births
Living people
Sportspeople from Hemel Hempstead
Footballers from Hertfordshire
English footballers
Association football goalkeepers
Tottenham Hotspur F.C. players
Viborg FF players
Orlando City SC players
Danish 1st Division players
Major League Soccer players
United States men's youth international soccer players
English expatriate footballers
Expatriate men's footballers in Denmark
Expatriate soccer players in the United States
English expatriate sportspeople in Denmark
English expatriate sportspeople in the United States
English people of American descent
English people of United States Virgin Islands descent